Three referendums were held in Liechtenstein during 1973. The first was held on 11 February on introducing women's suffrage, but was rejected by 55.9% of voters. The second was held on 14 October on changing the electoral system to a candidate-based proportional system one, and was approved by 55.8% of voters. The third on 14 October was on reducing the electoral threshold from 18% to 8%, and was approved by 67.9% of voters.

Results

Women's suffrage

New electoral system

Electoral threshold

References

Liechtenstein
Referendums
Referendums in Liechtenstein
Women's suffrage in Liechtenstein
Liechtenstein